Eduard Müller may refer to:
 Eduard Müller (philologist) (1804–1875), German gymnasium director
 Eduard Müller (German politician) (1818–1895), German priest, member of the German Reichstag, co-founder of the German Catholic Centre Party
 Eduard Müller (sculptor) (1828–1895), German sculptor
 Eduard Müller (Swiss politician) (1848–1919), member of the Federal Council, President of the Confederation
 Eduard Müller (internist) (1876–1928), German internist and neurologist
 Eduard Müller (martyr) (1911–1943), German Catholic priest and anti-Nazi Lübeck martyr
 Eduard Müller (cross-country skier) (born 1912), Swiss Olympic skier
 Eduard Müller (Austrian politician) (born 1962), Minister of Finance

See also
 Édouard Muller (disambiguation)